The Cumming Bandstand, in front of the Forsyth County Courthouse in Cumming, Georgia, was built in 1915.  It was listed on the National Register of Historic Places in 2002.

It is located at the junction of Court Square North (Main St.) and Court Square East (Dahlonega St.) in Cumming.

It was deemed "significant as one of a very small number of extant historic bandstands on county courthouse squares in Georgia. Although other historic bandstands exist in city parks and on current and former military bases, relatively few were ever built and very few remain on county
courthouse squares. Only two are currently listed in the National Register-both are included in historic downtown districts (in Bainbridge, Decatur County, and Sandersville, Washington County)—and no other National Register-eligible bandstands on county courthouse squares are known to exist at this time."

References

Bandstands in the United States
National Register of Historic Places in Forsyth County, Georgia
Buildings and structures completed in 1915